On a Deranged Holiday is the third studio album by Echo Orbiter. It was released on Looking Glass Workshop in 2001. The album was recorded following the band's broken tour due to the September 11th attacks, an array of issues such as stolen instruments, and the band's initial break up.  Despite the album ultimately receiving positive reviews, the band did not release, promote, or tour for the album, instead initially putting it aside with minimum release.

Track listing

Credits
Justin Emerle - guitar, vocals, percussion, keyboards
Colin Emerle - bass guitar

References

External links 
On A Deranged Holiday

2001 albums
Echo Orbiter albums